Oerel is a railway station in northwestern Germany. It is owned and operated by EVB, with regular trains on the line between Bremerhaven and Hamburg-Neugraben.

References

Railway stations in Lower Saxony
Eisenbahnen und Verkehrsbetriebe Elbe-Weser